Glypta is a genus of parasitoid wasps belonging to the family Ichneumonidae.

Species include:

 Glypta albanica
 Glypta abbreviata Dasch, 1988
 Glypta abrupta Dasch, 1988
 Glypta acares Momoi, 1965
 Glypta accentuata Dasch, 1988
 Glypta aclerivora Dasch, 1988
 Glypta adachii Uchida, 1928
 Glypta adornata Dasch, 1988
 Glypta aequorea Dasch, 1988
 Glypta alameda Dasch, 1988
 Glypta alaskensis Dasch, 1988
 Glypta albanica Habermehl, 1926
 Glypta alberta Dasch, 1988
 Glypta albifaciens Dasch, 1988
 Glypta albilineata Dasch, 1988
 Glypta albitibia Dasch, 1988
 Glypta albonotata Dasch, 1988
 Glypta algida Dasch, 1988
 Glypta alpestris Dasch, 1988
 Glypta altamirai Godoy & Gauld, 2002
 Glypta alternata Dasch, 1988
 Glypta amabilis Dasch, 1988
 Glypta ambigua Dasch, 1988
 Glypta amoena Dasch, 1988
 Glypta angelica Dasch, 1988
 Glypta angulata Dasch, 1988
 Glypta angusta Dasch, 1988
 Glypta animalcula Shestakov, 1927
 Glypta animosa Cresson, 1870
 Glypta antiochensis Dasch, 1988
 Glypta antonioi Godoy & Gauld, 2002
 Glypta applanata Dasch, 1988
 Glypta aprilis Viereck, 1905
 Glypta aquila Chiu, 1965
 Glypta arctata Dasch, 1988
 Glypta arctica Dasch, 1988
 Glypta arcuata Dasch, 1988
 Glypta areolata Viereck, 1903
 Glypta argyrotaeniae Dasch, 1988
 Glypta aridella Dasch, 1988
 Glypta asperata Dasch, 1988
 Glypta atrata Dasch, 1988
 Glypta aurea Godoy & Gauld, 2002
 Glypta aurora Brues, 1910
 Glypta australis Dasch, 1988
 Glypta bakeri Dasch, 1988
 Glypta banffensis Dasch, 1988
 Glypta barri Dasch, 1988
 Glypta bequaerti Dasch, 1988
 Glypta biauriculata Strobl, 1901
 Glypta bicarinata Dasch, 1988
 Glypta bifoveolata Gravenhorst, 1829
 Glypta bisinuata Momoi, 1963
 Glypta blandita Dasch, 1988
 Glypta boharti Dasch, 1988
 Glypta borealis Cresson, 1870
 Glypta bradleyi Dasch, 1988
 Glypta brevipetiolata Thomson, 1889
 Glypta breviterebra Momoi, 1963
 Glypta breviungulata Kuslitzky, 1876
 Glypta buccata Dasch, 1988
 Glypta bugaczensis Kiss, 1926
 Glypta bulbosa Dasch, 1988
 Glypta bungeae Kittel, 2016
 Glypta buolianae Dasch, 1988
 Glypta calianensis Constantineanu & Voicu, 1875
 Glypta californica Provancher, 1886
 Glypta caliginosa Dasch, 1988
 Glypta calva Dasch, 1988
 Glypta canadensis Cresson, 1870
 Glypta carinifrons Dasch, 1988
 Glypta carlsoni Dasch, 1988
 Glypta carolellae Dasch, 1988
 Glypta caryae Dasch, 1988
 Glypta caucasica Telenga, 1929
 Glypta caudata Thomson, 1889
 Glypta caulicola Cushman, 1933
 Glypta ceratites Gravenhorst, 1829
 Glypta cesta Dasch, 1988
 Glypta chinensis Uchida, 1952
 Glypta choristoneurae Dasch, 1988
 Glypta ciliata Schiodte, 1839
 Glypta clypeata Kuslitzky, 2007
 Glypta cockerelli Dasch, 1988
 Glypta cognata
 Glypta colfaxiana Dasch, 1988
 Glypta collina Dasch, 1988
 Glypta coloradana Dasch, 1988
 Glypta columbiana Dasch, 1988
 Glypta concava Dasch, 1988
 Glypta concisa Dasch, 1988
 Glypta concolor Ratzeburg, 1844
 Glypta conflictanae Dasch, 1988
 Glypta confragosa Dasch, 1988
 Glypta confusa Dasch, 1988
 Glypta consimilis Holmgren, 1860
 Glypta contrasta Dasch, 1988
 Glypta convexa Dasch, 1988
 Glypta cornigera Dasch, 1988
 Glypta cornuta Brischke, 1865
 Glypta costata Dasch, 1988
 Glypta costulata Kuslitzky, 2007
 Glypta crassa Dasch, 1988
 Glypta crebraria Dasch, 1988
 Glypta cudonigerae Dasch, 1988
 Glypta cuericiensis Godoy & Gauld, 2002
 Glypta curta Dasch, 1988
 Glypta cyclostoma Szepligeti, 1898
 Glypta cylindrator Fabricius, 1787
 Glypta cymolomiae Uchida, 1932
 Glypta daisetsuzana
 Glypta dakota Cresson, 1870
 Glypta davisii Dalla Torre, 1901
 Glypta decepta Dasch, 1988
 Glypta decora Dasch, 1988
 Glypta deflexa Dasch, 1988
 Glypta deleta Dasch, 1988
 Glypta delicata Dasch, 1988
 Glypta delicatula Kuslitzky, 2007
 Glypta densa Momoi, 1970
 Glypta densepunctata
 Glypta dentata Golovisnin, 1928
 Glypta dentifera Thomson, 1889
 Glypta depressa Dasch, 1988
 Glypta deserta Kuslitzky, 1976
 Glypta diminuta Dasch, 1988
 Glypta divaricata Say, 1835
 Glypta diversipes Walsh, 1873
 Glypta divisa Dasch, 1988
 Glypta dorsiatomanae Dasch, 1988
 Glypta dreisbachi Dasch, 1988
 Glypta dubia Ratzeburg, 1852
 Glypta dupla Dasch, 1988
 Glypta eberhardi Godoy & Gauld, 2002
 Glypta ecostata Szepligeti, 1898
 Glypta egregiafovea Viereck, 1905
 Glypta ejuncida Dasch, 1988
 Glypta elevata Dasch, 1988
 Glypta elongata Holmgren, 1860
 Glypta enigmatica Dasch, 1988
 Glypta epiblemae Dasch, 1988
 Glypta epinotiae Dasch, 1988
 Glypta erratica Cresson, 1870
 Glypta erugata Dasch, 1988
 Glypta eucosmae Walley & Barron, 1977
 Glypta evansi Dasch, 1988
 Glypta evetriae Cushman, 1917
 Glypta exartemae Walley, 1934
 Glypta exigua Dasch, 1988
 Glypta exophthalmus Kriechbaumer, 1887
 Glypta exposita Dasch, 1988
 Glypta extensor Dasch, 1988
 Glypta extincta Ratzeburg, 1852
 Glypta faceta Dasch, 1988
 Glypta fasciata Dasch, 1988
 Glypta femorator Desvignes, 1856
 Glypta ferruginea Dasch, 1988
 Glypta filicauda Dasch, 1988
 Glypta flagellaris Kuslitzky, 1973
 Glypta flaviscutator Aubert, 1964
 Glypta flavitarsus
 Glypta flavomaculata Dasch, 1988
 Glypta flavopicta Dasch, 1988
 Glypta floridana Dasch, 1988
 Glypta foutsi Dasch, 1988
 Glypta franciscana Dasch, 1988
 Glypta fronticornis Gravenhorst, 1829
 Glypta fulgida Dasch, 1988
 Glypta fulvipes Schiodte, 1839
 Glypta fumiferanae Viereck, 1912
 Glypta fumosa Dasch, 1988
 Glypta furcata Dasch, 1988
 Glypta fuscata Dasch, 1988
 Glypta fuscitibia Dasch, 1988
 Glypta gainesiana Dasch, 1988
 Glypta gelida Dasch, 1988
 Glypta georgiana Dasch, 1988
 Glypta georginensis Godoy & Gauld, 2002
 Glypta glabra Dasch, 1988
 Glypta glacialis Dasch, 1988
 Glypta glypta Ashmead, 1906
 Glypta gouldiana Dasch, 1988
 Glypta gracilis Hellen, 1915
 Glypta griseldae Dasch, 1988
 Glypta haesitator Gravenhorst, 1829
 Glypta hastata Dasch, 1988
 Glypta heinrichi Dasch, 1988
 Glypta herschelana Dasch, 1988
 Glypta heterocera Thomson, 1889
 Glypta hondoana Dasch, 1988
 Glypta hoodiana Dasch, 1988
 Glypta humilis Spinola, 1851
 Glypta ichitai
 Glypta ignota Dasch, 1988
 Glypta imitator Dasch, 1988
 Glypta implana Dasch, 1988
 Glypta impressa Davis, 1898
 Glypta improba Dasch, 1988
 Glypta improcera Dasch, 1988
 Glypta incisa Gravenhorst, 1829
 Glypta incognita Dasch, 1988
 Glypta incompleta Dasch, 1988
 Glypta inculta Dasch, 1988
 Glypta indivisa Dasch, 1988
 Glypta infrequens Dasch, 1988
 Glypta infumata Walley, 1934
 Glypta insignis Dasch, 1988
 Glypta interrupta Dasch, 1988
 Glypta interstincta Dasch, 1988
 Glypta inusitata Dasch, 1988
 Glypta ithacensis Dasch, 1988
 Glypta jacintana Dasch, 1988
 Glypta juncta Dasch, 1988
 Glypta juxta Dasch, 1988
 Glypta kamijoi Momoi, 1966
 Glypta kansensis Dasch, 1988
 Glypta karasawensis
 Glypta kasparyani Kuslitzky, 1976
 Glypta kincaidi Dasch, 1988
 Glypta kozlovi Kuslitzky, 1976
 Glypta kukakensis Ashmead, 1902
 Glypta kunashirica Kuslitzky, 2007
 Glypta laevis Dasch, 1988
 Glypta lapponica Holmgren, 1860
 Glypta lata Dasch, 1988
 Glypta latigaster Dasch, 1988
 Glypta lenis Dasch, 1988
 Glypta lepida Dasch, 1988
 Glypta limatula Dasch, 1988
 Glypta limbata Dasch, 1988
 Glypta linearis Dasch, 1988
 Glypta lineata Desvignes, 1856
 Glypta lirata Dasch, 1988
 Glypta longicauda Hartig, 1838
 Glypta longipalpus Dasch, 1988
 Glypta longispinis Gmelin, 1790
 Glypta longiungula Kuslitzky, 2007
 Glypta longiventris Cresson, 1870
 Glypta longula Godoy & Gauld, 2002
 Glypta longula Kuslitzky, 2007
 Glypta macilenta Dasch, 1988
 Glypta macra Cresson, 1870
 Glypta maculata Dasch, 1988
 Glypta magnifica Dasch, 1988
 Glypta mainensis Dasch, 1988
 Glypta manitobae Dasch, 1988
 Glypta marianae Dasch, 1988
 Glypta martini Dasch, 1988
 Glypta maruyamensis Uchida, 1928
 Glypta masoni Dasch, 1988
 Glypta mattagamiana Dasch, 1988
 Glypta mcallisteri Dasch, 1988
 Glypta mckinleyi Dasch, 1988
 Glypta media Momoi, 1963
 Glypta mensurator Fabricius, 1775
 Glypta meritanae Yarger, 1976
 Glypta metadecoris Godoy & Gauld, 2002
 Glypta michiganica Dasch, 1988
 Glypta microcera Thomson, 1889
 Glypta militaris Cresson, 1870
 Glypta mimica Dasch, 1988
 Glypta mimula Dasch, 1988
 Glypta minnesotae Dasch, 1988
 Glypta minuta Dasch, 1988
 Glypta missouriana Dasch, 1988
 Glypta momoii Kuslitzky, 2007
 Glypta monoceros Gravenhorst, 1829
 Glypta montana Dasch, 1988
 Glypta monticolae Kuslitzky, 1978
 Glypta munda Dasch, 1988
 Glypta mutica Cushman, 1919
 Glypta nana Dasch, 1988
 Glypta nebulosa Dasch, 1988
 Glypta nederlandica Dasch, 1988
 Glypta nevadana Dasch, 1988
 Glypta nigra Dasch, 1988
 Glypta nigricornis Thomson, 1889
 Glypta nigrina Desvignes, 1856
 Glypta nigripes Strobl, 1902
 Glypta nigrita Dasch, 1988
 Glypta nigroplica Thomson, 1889
 Glypta nipponica
 Glypta notata Szepligeti, 1898
 Glypta novaconcordica Dasch, 1988
 Glypta novascotiae Dasch, 1988
 Glypta novomexicana Dasch, 1988
 Glypta nuda Dasch, 1988
 Glypta nulla Dasch, 1988
 Glypta nursei Cameron, 1902
 Glypta obscura Dasch, 1988
 Glypta occidentalis Dasch, 1988
 Glypta occulta Dasch, 1988
 Glypta ohioensis Dasch, 1988
 Glypta ontariana Dasch, 1988
 Glypta ophthalmus Kriechbaumer, 1887
 Glypta oregonica Dasch, 1988
 Glypta orientalis Cushman, 1933
 Glypta ornata Kuslitzky, 1978
 Glypta ottawaensis Dasch, 1988
 Glypta palustra Dasch, 1988
 Glypta panamintana Dasch, 1988
 Glypta pansa Dasch, 1988
 Glypta parallela Dasch, 1988
 Glypta partita Dasch, 1988
 Glypta parvicaudata Bridgman, 1889
 Glypta patula Dasch, 1988
 Glypta pecki Dasch, 1988
 Glypta pectinata Dasch, 1988
 Glypta pedata Desvignes, 1856
 Glypta pennsylvanica Dasch, 1988
 Glypta petila Dasch, 1988
 Glypta pettitanae Dasch, 1988
 Glypta phanetae Dasch, 1988
 Glypta phantasmaria Dasch, 1988
 Glypta picea Dasch, 1988
 Glypta picta Kuslitzky, 2007
 Glypta pictipes Taschenberg, 1863
 Glypta pilula Dasch, 1988
 Glypta pisici Kolarov, 1981
 Glypta placida Dasch, 1988
 Glypta plana Dasch, 1988
 Glypta platynotae Dasch, 1988
 Glypta polita Dasch, 1988
 Glypta popofensis Ashmead, 1902
 Glypta prognatha Dasch, 1988
 Glypta prolata Dasch, 1988
 Glypta prolixa Dasch, 1988
 Glypta prominens Dasch, 1988
 Glypta prostata Dasch, 1988
 Glypta protrusa Dasch, 1988
 Glypta pulchra Dasch, 1988
 Glypta pulchripes Cresson, 1870
 Glypta pumila Dasch, 1988
 Glypta punctata Godoy & Gauld, 2002
 Glypta punctifera Dasch, 1988
 Glypta purpuranae Dasch, 1988
 Glypta quebecensis Dasch, 1988
 Glypta ralla Dasch, 1988
 Glypta resinanae Hartig, 1838
 Glypta rhyacioniae Walley & Barron, 1777
 Glypta robsonensis Dasch, 1988
 Glypta robusta Dasch, 1988
 Glypta rohweri Dasch, 1988
 Glypta rotunda Dasch, 1988
 Glypta rubricator Aubert, 1972
 Glypta rubripes Cresson, 1870
 Glypta rufa Uchida, 1928
 Glypta rufata Bridgman, 1887
 Glypta ruficornis Walsh, 1873
 Glypta rufipes Spinola, 1851
 Glypta rufipluralis Walsh, 1873
 Glypta rufiscutellaris Cresson, 1870
 Glypta rufitibialis Dasch, 1988
 Glypta rufiventris Kriechbaumer, 1894
 Glypta rufofasciata Cresson, 1870
 Glypta rufomarginata Cameron, 1886
 Glypta rufonotata Dasch, 1988
 Glypta rufula Dasch, 1988
 Glypta runcinata Dasch, 1988
 Glypta rutilata Dasch, 1988
 Glypta salicis Thomson, 1889
 Glypta salsolicola Schmiedeknecht, 1907
 Glypta santapaulae Dasch, 1988
 Glypta sanvita Godoy & Gauld, 2002
 Glypta saperdae Dasch, 1988
 Glypta saskatchewan Dasch, 1988
 Glypta satanas Dasch, 1988
 Glypta scabrosa Dasch, 1988
 Glypta scalaris Gravenhorst, 1829
 Glypta schneideri Krieger, 1897
 Glypta sculpturata Gravenhorst, 1829
 Glypta scutellaris Thomson, 1889
 Glypta separata Dasch, 1988
 Glypta severa Dasch, 1988
 Glypta shigaensis
 Glypta sierrae Dasch, 1988
 Glypta similis Bridgman, 1886
 Glypta solida Dasch, 1988
 Glypta sonomae Dasch, 1988
 Glypta spectabilis Dasch, 1988
 Glypta spissa Dasch, 1988
 Glypta stenota Dasch, 1988
 Glypta striatifrons Dasch, 1988
 Glypta strigosa Dasch, 1988
 Glypta subcornuta Gravenhorst, 1829
 Glypta subtilis Dasch, 1988
 Glypta succincta Dasch, 1988
 Glypta succineipennis Viereck, 1905
 Glypta sulcata Dasch, 1988
 Glypta suwai
 Glypta synnomae Dasch, 1988
 Glypta taiheizana Sonan, 1936
 Glypta talamanca Godoy & Gauld, 2002
 Glypta talitzkii Kuslitzky, 1974
 Glypta tama Kuslitzky, 1976
 Glypta tamanukii Uchida, 1928
 Glypta tappanensis Dasch, 1988
 Glypta tecta Dasch, 1988
 Glypta tegularis Thomson, 1889
 Glypta tenebrosa Dasch, 1988
 Glypta tenuata Dasch, 1988
 Glypta tenuicornis Thomson, 1889
 Glypta teres Gravenhorst, 1829
 Glypta tetonia Dasch, 1988
 Glypta tibialis Kuslitzky, 1974
 Glypta timberlakei Dasch, 1988
 Glypta tobiasi Kuslitzky, 1974
 Glypta tornata Dasch, 1988
 Glypta tortricis Dasch, 1988
 Glypta touyaensis
 Glypta transversa Dasch, 1988
 Glypta transversalis Scudder, 1890
 Glypta triangularis Momoi, 1963
 Glypta tricincta Provancher, 1890
 Glypta trilineata Dasch, 1988
 Glypta tripartita Dasch, 1988
 Glypta trochanterata Bridgman, 1886
 Glypta truncata Provancher, 1883
 Glypta tuberculator Aubert, 1972
 Glypta tuberculifrons Cresson, 1870
 Glypta tumifrons Godoy & Gauld, 2002
 Glypta tumor Momoi, 1970
 Glypta turgida Dasch, 1988
 Glypta tuta Kuslitzky, 1976
 Glypta ulbrichti Habermehl, 1926
 Glypta undulata Dasch, 1988
 Glypta unita Dasch, 1988
 Glypta utahensis Dasch, 1988
 Glypta varianae Dasch, 1988
 Glypta varicoxa Thomson, 1889
 Glypta variegata Dasch, 1988
 Glypta varipes Cresson, 1865
 Glypta verecunda Dasch, 1988
 Glypta vernalis Dasch, 1988
 Glypta verticalis Dasch, 1988
 Glypta vespertina Dasch, 1988
 Glypta victoriana Dasch, 1988
 Glypta viktorovi Kuslitzky, 1974
 Glypta vinnula Dasch, 1988
 Glypta virginiensis Cresson, 1870
 Glypta vittata Godoy & Gauld, 2002
 Glypta vulgaris Cresson, 1870
 Glypta vulnerator Gravenhorst, 1829
 Glypta wahli Godoy & Gauld, 2002
 Glypta washingtoniana Dasch, 1988
 Glypta werneri Dasch, 1988
 Glypta willsiana Dasch, 1988
 Glypta wisconsinensis Dasch, 1988
 Glypta woerzi Hedwig, 1952
 Glypta xanthogastra Cameron, 1905
 Glypta yasumatsui Uchida, 1952
 Glypta yukonensis Dasch, 1988
 Glypta zenibakoensis
 Glypta zomariae Dasch, 1988
 Glypta zonata Dasch, 1988
 Glypta zozanae Walley & Barron, 1977
 Glypta zurquiensis'' Godoy & Gauld, 2002

References

Ichneumonidae
Ichneumonidae genera
Taxa named by Johann Ludwig Christian Gravenhorst